The Mary Ward Adult Education Centre is part of the Mary Ward Settlement, in Queen Square, London.

History
The centre was founded by Mary Augusta Ward, a Victorian novelist and founding president of the Women's National Anti-Suffrage League, better known by her married name Mrs Humphry Ward. The original name of the institution was the Passmore Edwards Settlement, as it was part of the settlement movement, and was financed by John Passmore Edwards. The settlement began in 1890 as University Hall, located in Gordon Square.

Now named the Mary Ward Centre, it is located in Bloomsbury, an area of central London known for its literary and educational heritage. Its original 1898 building - still named Mary Ward House - is located just off Tavistock Square, was designed by Arnold Dunbar Smith and Cecil Claude Brewer and is considered to be a masterpiece of late Victorian architecture and is considered to be one of the best Arts and Crafts buildings in London.

In a speech to mark the opening of the Settlement in 1898 Mary Ward stated its mission as: “education, social intercourse, and debate of the wider sort, music, books, pictures, travel”. She added: “It is these that make life rich and animated, that ease the burden of it, that stand perpetually between a man and a woman and the darker, coarser temptations of our human road”. According to the Mary Ward House Conference and Exhibition Centre it is a listed Grade 1 building.

Over time the activities at the Settlement expanded to include fully equipped classrooms for children with disabilities, one of the first in England; pioneering the importance of play within children's education. the equivalent of an after school club; youth club for teenagers and a centre for pre and ante natal advice, among many others. It was the site of the historic debate on women's suffrage between Millicent Garrett Fawcett and Mrs Humphry Ward in February 1909, when the host was decisively defeated. In 1920 Mary Ward died and the following year the Settlement was renamed as the Mary Ward Settlement in memory of her work. In addition to the educational centre, the organisation includes the Mary Ward Legal Centre.

Present
The Mary Ward Adult Education Centre is based at 42 Queen Square, and runs over 1000 classes. The Mary Ward Legal Centre is based nearby at 10 Great Turnstile, also in Holborn. The Mary Ward Legal Centre provides free, independent advice to people who live and work in London to help them access their legal rights and entitlements. A small number of classes such as dance, movement and counselling take place at 10 Great Turnstile.

In late 2018, The Mary Ward Adult Education Centre announced in a letter to students their plans to move to new premises in Stratford, East London. In the letter, students were told the organisation had purchased a new building in Queensway House on Stratford High Street, citing the "unaffordable" cost of their current location and the need for specialist educational provision in East London as factors influencing their decision to move.

Art on display
The Mary Ward Centre houses the painting John Passmore Edwards (1823–1905) by Felix Moscheles. Also on display are two works by Marc Breen, Untitled and Rooftops of Queen Square, as well as a 1904 portrait in chalk of Mary Ward by Albert Sterner.

See also
 Guild of Play

References

External links
 Mary Ward (Adult Education) Centre website - current activities of the Centre (Accessed 24 February 2008).
Photograph of Tavistock Place building on the website of the Victoria and Albert Museum (Accessed 24 February 2008).
 Mary Ward and the Passmore Edwards Settlement: INFED Website giving History.
 The Mary Ward House Trust website (not in use at 8 October 2009).
 The Mary Ward House Exhibition and Conference Centre (accessed 8 October 2009).
- a Bluffton University page on the Mary Ward Settlement and its architects (accessed 8 October 2009).
 Mary Ward Settlement - part of the London Metropolitan Archives Collection (Accessed 26 November 2013)

Further education colleges in London
Education in the London Borough of Camden
Learning and Skills Beacons
Adult education in the United Kingdom